Entre Mar y Palmera Tour is the title of the world tour of Dominican superstar Juan Luis Guerra and 4:40 to promote his live album of the same title, his EP Prive and to celebrate the 30th Anniversary of his blockbuster album Bachata Rosa. The tour kicked off February 12, 2022, in Punta Cana, Dominican Republic and is expected to end on July 10, 2022, in Madrid, Spain. The Tour consisted of two legs – the first one in Puerto Rico, Dominican Republic and United States and the second in Spain.

Background 
Guerra's previous tour, Literal Tour Grandes Éxitos, was expected to end on December 12, 2020, with a massive concert at the Estadio Olimipico in Santo Domingo, Dominican Republic. However, it was cancelled due the COVID-19 pandemic. On December 25, 2020, Guerra released a special live stream as a Christmas gift for his fans, and he released Prive EP. On June 3, 2021, he broadcast a special concert for HBO Latino and later released his second album Entre Mar y Palmeras. Shortly after, he announced a world tour with the same name.

Overview 
In December 2021, Guerra announced a four-concert residency at the Hard Rock Café & Casino Punta Cana. The tour was set to kick off February 5, 2022; however, it was postponed due heavy rain and bad weather. The final concert of the residency on April 2, 2022, had an attendance of 5,000 fans and received positive reviews by local media. The concert at Miami FX Arena was supposed to be played on April 30, 2022; however, it was postponed to May 13, 2022, due Guerra testing positive to COVID-19. Despite this, it received positive reviews by the media and critics. The concert at the Coliseo de Puerto Rico in San Juan was reported by the media to be sold out and also received critical acclaim by critics.In Madrid, the concert was reported sold out with over 15,000 tickets sold.The concert in Lima, Peru was reported sold out within minutes on been announced.Also, the tickets for the concer in Santiago de Chile were quickly sold out.

Tour dates

Notes

Cancelled shows

References 

2022 concert tours
Juan Luis Guerra